Owenmore River may refer to:
 Owenmore River (Connemara), a river in Connemara, in County Galway, Ireland
 Owenmore River (County Mayo), a river in County Mayo, Ireland
 Owenmore River (County Sligo), a river in County Sligo, Ireland
 Owenmore River (County Cavan), a river in County Cavan, Ireland